May Mabel Adamson (1891–1966) was the principal of the Queensland Central Technical College's Domestic Science High School from October 1953 till June 30, 1957.

Biography
Adamson was born in Cooktown, Queensland as one of six children of Reverend John Adamson and his wife Caroline, and was educated in Maryborough Girls' Grammar School. Her younger sister Amy led a similar career path, also ultimately becoming a headmistress of the Maryborough State High and Intermediate School for Girls.

She worked as an assistant on probation at Maryborough East State School, then taught at a series of schools until she returned in to Brisbane to teach at Milton in 1932. From 1927 she studied part-time whilst working and graduated with a Bachelor of Arts from the University of Queensland in 1940. In 1936 she started at the Central Technical College's Domestic Science High School and in October 1953 she was appointed principal. She retired on June 30, 1957 and moved to Sydney.

Adamson died on October 3, 1966, and was cremated in Wahroonga, Sydney.

References

1891 births
1966 deaths
Schoolteachers from Queensland
University of Queensland alumni
Australian headmistresses
19th-century Australian women
20th-century Australian women